Saint-Césaire is a commune in the Charente-Maritime department, administrative region of Nouvelle-Aquitaine (before 2015: Poitou-Charentes), southwestern France. In the 1970s, a Neanderthal skeleton was found near Saint-Césaire.

Population

See also
Communes of the Charente-Maritime department

References

Communes of Charente-Maritime
Neanderthal sites
Charente-Maritime communes articles needing translation from French Wikipedia